Kuln may refer to:
 Kolm-e Bala
 Kolm-e Pain